Aramex is an Emirati (Jordanian Origin) multinational logistics, courier and package delivery company based in Dubai, United Arab Emirates (UAE). The company was founded by Fadi Ghandour and Bill Kingson in 1982 in Amman, Jordan. It is the first Arab-based company to be listed on the NASDAQ stock exchange. Aramex is listed on the Dubai Financial Market. Othman Aljeda serves as the company's CEO. Aramex has approximately 18,000 employees in 70 countries.

Thomas Friedman profiled the company in his book, The World Is Flat.

History
Fadi Ghandour co-founded Aramex shortly after receiving his BA in political science from George Washington University, with his business partner, Bill Kingson in 1982. Kingson, a friend of Ghandour's father and owner of a small courier company in the New York tri-state area, discussed the business with Fadi Ghandour after he had expressed interest in the business. After their discussion, Kingson proposed a partnership to establish a courier business in the Middle East with Ghandour.

The company began operations in Amman, Jordan. Arab American Express aimed to become the first courier company in the Middle East. At the time there were no international courier companies based in the region because of logistical and bureaucratic challenges caused by civil wars and complex political relationships. The company's first international delivery was a document for the Housing Bank for Trade and Finance based in Jordan to New York City. Within two years, the company's name was shortened to Aramex.

In 1984, the company's operations were less than $1 million in revenue. Aramex offered Airborne Express 50% ownership of the company for $100,000, that year. Airborne Express declined the offer because it did not have the resources to invest in a small market such as the Middle East. The partnership made Aramex responsible for Airborne's business in the region. Aramex moved its headquarters to Dubai, United Arab Emirates in 1985.

Aramex gained Federal Express as a client in 1987. In the first year of partnership, 30% of Aramex's revenue came from packages originating from the Federal Express network. Airborne Express acquired 9% of Aramex for $2 million. Aramex was listed on the NASDAQ stock exchange in January 1997. The company became the first Arab-based company to trade its shares on an American stock exchange. Aramex's valuation was $24 million and the IPO raised $7 million. The company accrued $66 million in revenue.

The company expanded its operations to 120 locations in 33 countries, primarily emerging markets in the Middle East and Southeast Asia by 2001. The company's strategy was to enter high-growth markets characterized by high populations and liberalizing economies. During summer 2001, Abraaj Capital, the first private equity firm in the Middle East, proposed Aramex a leveraged buyout offer that would take the company off of the NASDAQ stock exchange. The deal was accepted and Abraaj Capital acquired the majority of Aramex for $65 million in February 2002. The deal allowed Kingson and Airborne to exit, while Ghandour retained 25% of the company and management control. Abraaj acquired 75% of Aramex and made 6% of its shares available to company employees in the form of stock. Between 2002 and 2003 Aramex's net income rose from $4 million to $10 million.

In 2003, DHL acquired Airborne Express, Aramex's main United States partner. This resulted in Airborne Express exiting the Airborne Alliance. In the same year, Aramex took over the alliance and co-founded the Global Distribution Alliance (GDA), a global alliance of 40 express companies with combined revenues of $7.5 billion. Aramex is chairing the alliance which uses a shipment management system developed by the company.

Aramex went public on the Dubai Financial Market in February 2005. The IPO raised $270 million. The company's revenue increased 23% over 2004 and net income increased 56% that year.

As part of its expansion plans, Aramex concluded a series of acquisitions, including Priority Airfreight, InfoFort, Freight Professionals and TwoWay-Vanguard.

World-renowned writer and columnist Thomas Friedman used Aramex in his book, The World Is Flat, as an example of companies that benefit from what he calls the flattening of the world. The flattening of the world is the leveling of the economic field and the destruction of "barriers to entry," opening the door wide for an individual or a company anywhere in the world to collaborate or compete globally.

Expansion
In February 2011, Aramex acquired OneWorld Courier and In-Time Couriers, two Kenyan courier firms. Aramex acquired Berco Express, a South African logistics firm in December 2011. PayPal partnered with Aramex in 2012. The partnership gave PayPal credibility in the Middle East, while opening up new markets abroad for Aramex. Aramex developed REDe, a solution aimed at enabling companies to begin selling their products online, in early 2012. ShopGo, an e-commerce solution, released Aramex Suite in August 2013. The module enabled e-commerce stores to automatically access several of Aramex's services.

Aramex launched Aramex Bio, a medical courier service in March 2014. The service was launched in the Middle East and North Africa. In June 2014, Aramex acquired Mail Call Couriers, an Australian courier service, which at the end of 2016, was acquired by Australia Post. In January 2016, Fastway Couriers, a New Zealand-based courier service with operations in New Zealand, Australia, South Africa and Ireland announced that it had been acquired by Aramex. In 2019, Aramex acquired Saudi Tal for Commerce and Contract Company to expand its operations in Saudi Arabia.

In October 2021, GeoPost, the express parcel arm of French Groupe La Poste acquired a 20.15% stake in Aramex.

Sustainability
The company supported the Ruwwad Al Tanmeya initiative in 2006. The initiative aimed to involve the private sector in spurring community development through youth empowerment and investments in the community through education, civic engagement and volunteering. Aramex has a twenty percent stake in Ruwwad Al Tanmeya.

Aramex became the first company in the region to release an annual sustainability report in 2006. The company joined the United Nations Global Compact, the world's largest global corporate citizenship initiative, in 2007.

References

Companies established in 1982
1982 establishments in Jordan
Multinational companies headquartered in the United Arab Emirates
Logistics companies of the United Arab Emirates
Companies listed on the Dubai Financial Market
Companies based in Dubai